The Mbunga are an ethnic and linguistic Bantu group from Kilolo District of Iringa Region and Morogoro Region in Tanzania.  In 1987 the Mbunga population was estimated to number 29,000.

References 

Ethnic groups in Tanzania
Indigenous peoples of East Africa